Red Hot Rhythm (1929) is an American pre-Code early sound musical film directed by Leo McCarey, and starring Alan Hale Sr., Kathryn Crawford, Walter O'Keefe, and Josephine Dunn.

As originally released by Pathé Exchange, the film featured sequences in Multicolor. However the whole film was considered a lost film,  except one number in color, the title song that survives.

Cast
Alan Hale Sr. as Walter
Kathryn Crawford as Mary
Walter O'Keefe as Sam
Josephine Dunn as Claire
Anita Garvin as Mable
Ilka Chase as Mrs. Fioretta
Ernest Hilliard as Eddie Graham
Harry Bowen as Whiffle
James Clemens	as Singe (as Jimmy Clemons)

References
1. The American Film Institute Desk Reference: The Complete Guide to Everything You Need to Know about the Movies

External links

1920s color films
1929 lost films
1929 films
1929 musical films
Early color films
Films directed by Leo McCarey
American musical films
Lost American films
1920s American films
Pathé Exchange films